The 15th Pan American Games were held in Rio de Janeiro, Brazil from 13 July 2007 to 29 July 2007. Chile participated with 228 athletes (144 men, 84 women).

Medalists

| style="text-align:left; width:78%; vertical-align:top;"|

| style="text-align:left; width:22%; vertical-align:top;"|

Results by event

Tennis

Chile nominated three male and three female tennis players to compete in the tournament.

Men

Women

Triathlon

Men's Competition
Felipe van de Wyngard
 1:56:53.86 — 20th place
Benjamin Muñizaga
 2:07:41.01 — 30th place

Women's Competition
Bárbara Riveros
 2:01:42.89 — 8th place

See also
Chile at the Pan American Games
Events at the 2007 Pan American Games
Chile at the 2008 Summer Olympics

External links
Pan American Games Rio 2007 Games Official site.
COCH - Comité Olimpico de Chile Official site.

Nations at the 2007 Pan American Games
P
2007